The University of Natural Resources and Life Sciences, Vienna, or simply BOKU (derived from its German name, Universität für Bodenkultur Wien), founded in 1872, is an education and research centre for renewable resources in Vienna, Austria. BOKU combines expertise in the fields of natural sciences, engineering and biotechnology as well as social and economic sciences. In research and teaching, it focuses on

 the conservation and development of protection for habitats, economy and living standards
 the management of natural resources and  environment
 the protection of food and health

BOKU sees itself as an innovation leader in the green economy, with the goal of integrating sustainability into all processes in society. It is a member of the Euroleague for Life Sciences (ELLS), the United Nations Academic Impact (UNAI), the European University Initiative (EPICUR), the Austrian-African Research Network (Africa UniNet) and numerous other international cooperations. There are currently 10,941 students from over 100 countries enrolled at BOKU.

Campus 
After 27 years at Palais Schönborn the City of Vienna decided in 1896 to build a new campus at Türkenschanzpark in the 18th district. The departments of sustainable agriculture, soil science, horticulture, animal husbandry, economics and social sciences are still headquartered at this original campus. Another city campus, located at Muthgasse in the 19th district near the Heiligenstadt underground station, is the headquarters for the biotechnology, chemistry, plant sciences, water resource management, waste management and food sciences departments. There is also a research facility complex in Tulln, north of the city, with biotechnology and agricultural sciences laboratories and facilities. Other important locations and testing fields are Groß-Enzersdorf (Lower Austria), Jedlersdorf (Vienna), Knödelhütte (Vienna), Heuberg/Rosalia (Burgenland) and the Water Cluster Lunz am See (Lower Austria).

Departments and Research Units

15 Departments of BOKU 
Department of Material Sciences and Process Engineering
Department of Biotechnology
Department of Water, Atmosphere and Environment
Department of Nanobiotechnology
Department of Chemistry
Department of Integrative Biology and Biodiversity Research
Department of Food science and Technology
Department of Landscape, Spatial and Infrastructure Sciences
Department of Economics and Social Sciences
Department of Sustainable Agricultural Systems
Department of Civil Engineering and Natural Hazards
Department of Forest- and Soil Sciences
Department of Crop Sciences
Department of Agrobiotechnology, IFA-Tulln
Department of Applied Genetics and Cell Biology

Research Units and Initiatives 
Center for Agricultural Sciences
Center for Bioeconomy
Center for Global Change and Sustainability

Studies 
BOKU offers 8 BSc programmes and 28 MSc programmes. Most of them allow various specialisations and possibilities for majors. The language of instruction is partly German, partly English. For many MSc programmes the language of instruction is English only. In general, programmes start each year in October and take three years for a BSc diploma with 180 ECTS credits and two years for a MSc diploma with 120 ECTS credits. Studies are in the field of natural resources management, life sciences & biotechnology, civil & environmental engineering, landscape planning, agriculture, forestry and winemaking.

The PhD programme is a three-year programme with 180 ECTS credits which consists of a research component (conducting research under supervision and writing a thesis) and a smaller education component. In order to guarantee adequate supervision, the research subject must fit the research programme of BOKU and its institutes.

Due to BOKU's extensive world-wide engagement, the university offers many international MSc programmes as joint or double degree. It is also a member of the Euroleague for Life Sciences university network, partnering with University of Copenhagen, Faculty of Science (SCIENCE), Swedish University of Agricultural Sciences (SLU), Czech University of Life Sciences Prague (CULS), University of Hohenheim (UHOH), Warsaw University of Life Sciences (WULS-SGGW), Wageningen University and Research Centre (WUR), China Agricultural University (CAU), Hebrew University of Jerusalem, Robert H. Smith Faculty of Agriculture, Food and Environment (HUJI), Lincoln University, New Zealand (LU) and Cornell University, College of Agriculture and Life Sciences (CALS).

Notable alumni

 Leopold Figl – Federal Chancellor of Austria (1945–1953)
 Franz Fischler – EU Commissioner for Agriculture, Rural Development and Fisheries (1995–2004)
 Nikolaus Berlakovich – Federal Minister of Agriculture and Forestry (2008–2013)
 Luis Durnwalder – Governor of South Tyrol (1989–2014)
 Günter Haiden – Federal Minister of Agriculture and Forestry (1976–1986)
 Sabine Herlitschka – CEO of Infineon Technologies Austria (2014–present)
 Sixtus Lanner – Austrian MP (1934–2022)
 Hans Lechner – Governor of the State of Salzburg (1961–1977)
 Hermann Neubacher – Mayor of Vienna (1938–1940)
 Erwin Pröll – Governor of Lower Austria (1992–2017)
 Josef Pröll – Federal Minister of Finance and Vice-Chancellor (2008–2011)
 Hans Tuppy – Biochemist and Federal Minister of Science (1987–1989)
 Oskar Weihs – Federal Minister of Agriculture and Forestry (1970–1976)
 Andrä Rupprechter – Federal Minister of Agriculture and Forestry (2013–2017)

Notable scientists

 Walter Bitterlich - Forest Scientist and Inventor
 Adolf Cieslar - Forest Scientist
 Adolf Ritter von Guttenberg - Forest Scientist
 Herbert Killian - Forest Historian
 Josef Kisser - Botanist
 Helga Kromp-Kolb – Meteorologist und Climate Scientist, Austrian Scientist of the Year 2005 
 Wilhelm Neurath - Economist
 Emil Perels - Land Planner
 Karl Prachar - Mathematician
 Karl E. Schedl - Zoologist and Forest Scientist
 Franz Schwackhöfer - Chemist
 Erich von Tschermak-Seysenegg - Plant researcher
 Martin Wilckens - Animal researcher and Founding Rector of BOKU

Notes and references

External links
University of Natural Resources and Life Sciences, Vienna (English version)
Prospectus (English version)

 
Universities and colleges in Vienna
Forestry education
Forestry in Austria
Educational institutions established in 1872
1872 establishments in Austria
Universities established in the 19th century